Nodicostellaria laterculata is a species of sea snail, a marine gastropod mollusk, in the family Costellariidae, the ribbed miters.

Distribution
This marine species occurs off Guadeloupe.

References

 Melvill, J. C. (1925). Description of nine new species of Mitridae. Proceedings of the Malacological Society of London. 16(5): 215-219, pl. 10.

External links
 Fedosov A.E., Puillandre N., Herrmann M., Dgebuadze P. & Bouchet P. (2017). Phylogeny, systematics, and evolution of the family Costellariidae (Gastropoda: Neogastropoda). Zoological Journal of the Linnean Society. 179(3): 541-626.

Costellariidae